Eudonia crassiuscula is a moth in the family Crambidae. It was described by Harrison Gray Dyar Jr. in 1929. It is found in Brazil (Paraná) and French Guiana.

The wingspan is about 13 mm.

References

Moths described in 1929
Eudonia